Joseph F. Murphy Jr. (January 9, 1944 – July 28, 2022) was an American lawyer and jurist from Baltimore, Maryland. Between December 17, 2007, and September 30, 2011, he was a judge of the Maryland Court of Appeals, the highest court in Maryland. Prior to this appointment, Murphy served as the Chief Judge of the Court of Special Appeals, Maryland's intermediate court of appeals. He was also an instructor at the University of Maryland Francis King Carey School of Law.

Background
Born in Fitchburg, Massachusetts on January 9, 1944, Murphy attended St. Bernard's High School, Fitchburg; Boston College, A.B., 1965; and University of Maryland School of Law, J.D., 1969. He was admitted to the Maryland Bar in 1969. Murphy practiced law as a staff attorney for Legal Aid then as an Assistant State's Attorney, Baltimore City from 1970 to 1975, then as Deputy State's Attorney for Baltimore City from 1975 to 1976. After leaving the office of the State's attorney, he was a named partner at the Towson law firm of White & Murphy.

Judicial career
Associate Judge, Baltimore County Circuit Court, 3rd Judicial Circuit, 1984–93. 
Judge, Court of Special Appeals, (at-large) July 25, 1993 – 1996
Chief Judge, Court of Special Appeals, 1996 – December 17, 2007
Judge, Court of Appeals, (2nd Appellate Circuit (Baltimore & Harford counties)), December 17, 2007 – September 30, 2011.

Upon his retirement from the bench, Judge Murphy joined the Baltimore-based law firm of Silverman, Thompson, Slutkin & White, where he served as litigation support, and headed the firm's Alternative Dispute Resolution practice. Judge Murphy's daughter is currently an attorney in the firm's appellate litigation division. On December 22, 2011, Maryland Governor Martin O'Malley announced his appointment of Robert N. ("Bob") McDonald, the Chief Counsel of Opinions and Advice for the Office of the Attorney General of Maryland, to the Court of Appeals replacing Judge Murphy.

Judge Murphy died on July 27, 2022, at the age of 78 after suffering from cancer.

Awards
2004 Man of All Seasons Award, St. Thomas More Society of Maryland
2003 Maryland Top Leadership in Law Award, Daily Record
2003 Maryland Champion for Victims Award, Maryland Crime Victims' Resource Center

References

External links 
Maryland Court of Appeals official site
 Maryland Court of Appeals, "Judge Joseph Murphy sworn in to Court of Appeals", December 18, 2007

1944 births
2022 deaths
People from Fitchburg, Massachusetts
Boston College alumni
University of Maryland Francis King Carey School of Law alumni
Judges of the Maryland Court of Appeals